Richard Vincent Oliver Jr. (April 11, 1939 – November 11, 2016) was a television reporter of Good Day New York held in New York City (1988–2002).

Career
Oliver was born in Astoria, Queens. He graduated from William Cullen Bryant High School, and received his bachelor's degree from Columbia University and master's degree from Columbia School of Journalism.

On July 19, 2001, while field reporting on a landlord-tenant dispute, he was involved in a heated exchange live on air with Good Day New York anchor Jim Ryan. Less than two months later, on the morning of September 11, Oliver had been on assignment in Lower Manhattan when the attack on the World Trade Center occurred. His live report was among the earliest news coverage of the event. He would retire from Fox the following year and afterwards taught journalism at Columbia University, Hunter College and New York University.

References

New York (state) television reporters
1939 births
2016 deaths
Columbia University alumni
Columbia University Graduate School of Journalism alumni
William Cullen Bryant High School alumni